Piirsalu is a village in Lääne-Nigula Parish, Lääne County, in western Estonia.

Estonian actor Arno Suurorg (1903-1960) was born in Piirsalu.

References

 

Villages in Lääne County
Kreis Wiek